Dzierzbin  (1940-1945 German: Uhlenflucht) a village in the administrative district of Gmina Mycielin, within Kalisz County, Greater Poland Voivodeship, in west-central Poland.

The village has a population of 260.

References

Dzierzbin